The 64th World Science Fiction Convention (Worldcon), also known as L.A.con IV, was held on 23–27 August 2006 at the Anaheim Convention Center and the nearby Hilton and Marriott hotels in Anaheim, California, United States.

The organizing committee was chaired by Christian B. McGuire.

Participants 

Attendance was 5,913, out of 6,832 paid memberships, based on preliminary post-convention data reported by the committee. The members came from 23 different countries, of which the largest contingents were from the United States, Canada, United Kingdom, Australia, and Japan.

Guests of Honor 

 Connie Willis (author)
 James Gurney (artist)
 Howard DeVore (fan)
 Frankie Thomas (special guest)

Participating writers 

In addition to the guests of honor, the convention has announced the names of the people participating in the program.

Awards

2006 Hugo Awards 

 Best Novel: Spin by Robert Charles Wilson
 Best Novella: "Inside Job" by Connie Willis
 Best Novelette: "Two Hearts" by Peter S. Beagle
 Best Short Story: "Tk'tk'tk" by David D. Levine
 Best Related Book: Storyteller: Writing Lessons and More from 27 Years of the Clarion Writers' Workshop by Kate Wilhelm
 Best Dramatic Presentation, Long Form: Serenity, written and directed by Joss Whedon.
 Best Dramatic Presentation, Short Form: Doctor Who: The Empty Child & The Doctor Dances, written by Steven Moffat, directed by James Hawes.
 Best Professional Editor: David G. Hartwell
 Best Professional Artist: Donato Giancola
 Best Semiprozine: Locus, edited by Charles N. Brown, Kirsten Gong-Wong, and Liza Groen Trombi
 Best Fanzine: Plokta, edited by Alison Scott, Steve Davies, and Mike Scott
 Best Fan Writer: Dave Langford
 Best Fan Artist: Frank Wu

Other awards 

 John W. Campbell Award for Best New Writer: John Scalzi
 Special Committee Awards: Betty Ballantine, Harlan Ellison, Fred Patten

Future site selection 

The members of L.A.con IV (and Interaction, the 2005 Worldcon) selected the hosting city for the 66th World Science Fiction Convention, to be held in 2008.

See also 

 Hugo Award
 Science fiction
 Speculative fiction
 World Science Fiction Society
 Worldcon

References

External links 

 Homepage of L.A.con IV

2006 conferences
2006 in California
2006 in the United States
Culture of Los Angeles
Science fiction conventions in the United States
Worldcon